The End of the Trail is a Hardy Boys book. It was first published in 2000.

Plot summary
Biff Hooper, Phil Cohen, and Chet Morton go with the Hardy Boys on a hike up the Appalachian Trail, but things take a turn for the worse when Biff is hurt. The boys go to Morgan's Quarry, the nearest town, for help, and find a bag of cash in the middle of the road. Now, the Hardy Boys must find the owner, or face death.

References

The Hardy Boys books
2000 American novels
2000 children's books
Appalachian Trail